The 2023 NCAA Division III women's basketball tournament is the tournament hosted by the NCAA to determine the national champion of Division III women's college basketball in the United States for the 2022–23 season. It featured 64 teams.

The championship game will be held on April 1, 2023, at the American Airlines Center in Dallas, concurrent with the Division I Final Four, while the national semifinals were played at Oosting Gymnasium at Trinity College in Hartford, Connecticut on March 18, 2023.

Tournament schedule and venues

Regionals
The first and second rounds took place at campus sites from March 3–4, 2023. Teams were sent to one of 16 locations, each hosted by one team from the group of four.

The third and fourth rounds (sectional semifinals and finals) also took place at campus sites from March 10–11, 2023. Teams were sent to the home arena of one of the four teams remaining in their sectional bracket.

Final Four
The national semifinals and finals are being held at predetermined sites: the former at the Oosting Gymnasium at Trinity College in Hartford, Connecticut, on March 18, and the latter at the American Airlines Center in Dallas.

The national championship will be played on April 1, 2023 in Dallas, which is also the host of the 2023 NCAA Division I women's basketball tournament final four.

Qualifying
A total of sixty-four bids were available for the tournament: Forty-three automatic bids—awarded to the champions of the 43 NCAA-recognized Division III conference tournaments—and 21 at-large bids.

While this is the first season for the newly established Collegiate Conference of the South, its conference tournament champion will not be eligible for an automatic bid until 2024.

This is also the final year that the Colonial States Athletic Conference and United East Conference receive separate bids; the two conferences will merge ahead of the 2023–24 season, consolidating their bids into one, although the name and legacy of the combined conference have not yet been announced.

Automatic bids (44)

At-large bids (20)

Brackets
Source

Upper Left

Bottom Left

Upper Right

Bottom Right

Final Four

Sectional Hosting Controversy
When sectional hosts were announced on March 5, there was some controversy as three of the four hosts were placed in the state of Massachusetts and all four in the Eastern Time Zone. Most of the controversy came when Tufts, with its 21–6 regular season record, was granted hosting rights over 26–1 Trinity (TX), with top seed Christopher Newport unable to host due to the men's sectional being held at CNU the same weekend.  Three teams would have to travel via air regardless of where the pod was placed, an unusual occurrence for a Division III sectional.  D3sports.com's Pat Coleman observed "Texas teams get screwed so often [by the NCAA], in every sport. This was a chance for a makeup call that was sorely missed, and it's an example Texas teams can point to and say, even when the number of flights is equal, we still get screwed."  Further analysis by Coleman showed a long-standing policy by the NCAA to deny sectional hosts in Texas or the larger Region 10 (which also includes the states of Colorado, California, Oregon, and Washington), with only a single sectional (of 56) hosted in the region since the sectional concept was introduced in 2000.

See also
 2023 NCAA Division I women's basketball tournament
 2023 NCAA Division II women's basketball tournament
 2023 NAIA women's basketball tournament
 2023 NCAA Division III men's basketball tournament

References

 
NCAA Division III women's basketball tournament
NCAA Division III women's basketball tournament
NCAA Division III women's basketball tournament
Basketball in Dallas